The following is a list of programs currently or formerly broadcast on Buzzr. Some of these shows have aired on Game Show Network in the past.

Current programming

Regularly airing
Body Language
Classic Concentration (Trebek)
Family Feud (Dawson)
Let's Make a Deal (Hall)
Match Game (Rayburn)
Match Game PM
Match Game-Hollywood Squares Hour
Password (Ludden)
Password Plus (Ludden and Kennedy)
Press Your Luck (Tomarken)
Supermarket Sweep (Ruprecht)
Super Password
Talk About
Tattletales
To Tell the Truth (Moore)

Seasonal
The Great Christmas Light Fight

Educational programming
Animal Rescue
Joseph Prince
Science Now
Through the Bible with Les Feldick

Former programming

Beat the Clock (Collyer, Wood and Hall)
The Better Sex
Blockbusters (Cullen)
Bzzz!
Call My Bluff
Card Sharks (Perry, Eubanks and Rafferty)
Celebrity Name Game
Child's Play
Choose Up Sides
Concentration (Narz)
Double Dare (Trebek)
Family Feud (Combs, Anderson and Karn)
Family Feud Challenge
Get the Message
He Said, She Said (Garagiola)
It's News to Me (Daly)
I've Got A Secret (Moore and Allen)
Make the Connection (Rayburn)
The Match Game (1962 pilot & 1964 "All-Star" episodes)
Match Game (Shafer and Baldwin)
Million Dollar Password
Mindreaders
Missing Links (1963 pilot)
Monster Garage
Monster House
The Name's the Same (Lewis)
The Newlywed Game (Eubanks and Kroeger)
Now You See It (Narz)
Number Please
Play Your Hunch
The Price Is Right (Cullen)
Richard Simmons' Dream Maker
Sale of the Century (Perry)
Say When!!
Showoffs
Split Personality (1959 game show)
Split Second (Hall)
Strike It Rich
Temptation
To Tell the Truth (Collyer, Garagiola, Ward, Elliott, Swann, Trebek, O'Hurley and Anderson)
Nothing But the Truth (Wallace)
Trivia Trap
What's Going On?
What's My Line? (Daly, Bruner and Blyden)
Whew!
Winner Take All (Cullen)
Wordplay

Pilots
Body Talk
It Had to Be You
On a Roll
Play for Keeps!
Star Words
TKO
Take Your Choice

Specials
TV's Funniest Game Show Moments
What's My Line? at 25

Original
Game Changers

References

External links
 Buzzr's official website

Lists of television series by network